The 100 Mile House Wranglers are a junior 'B' ice hockey team based in 100 Mile House, British Columbia, Canada. They are members of the Doug Birks Division of the Okanagan/Shuswap Conference of the Kootenay International Junior Hockey League (KIJHL). The Wranglers play their home games at the South Cariboo Rec Centre. Tom Bachynski is the team's governor and Dale Hladun is the general manager and coach. They are currently captained by forward Ethan Sanders.

The Wranglers joined the league in 2013 as a relocated team. The franchise originally started as the Summerland Sting in 2001, then relocated to Penticton as the Penticton Lakers in 2009. The Lakers short-lived era would come to an end when they relocated prior to the 2013-14 season to 100 Mile House to become the Wranglers. In its short KIJHL history, the team has won the Keystone Cup, the Cyclone Taylor Cup and the KIJHL Championship once, in 2016. They won one division playoff title as a member of the Doug Birks Division from 2013-2023 and one conference playoff title as a member of the Okanagan/Shuswap Conference from 2013-2023.

Team history

2001–09: Summerland Sting
The start of the new expansion franchise saw the Sting finish third in the Okanagan Shuswap Division in their first year (2001-02 season) and lost to the Revelstoke Grizzlies, 0-4 in the Division Semifinals. In the Sting's eight-year existence, they never advanced past the second round. Due to poor records and attendance, they were relocated prior to the start of the 2009-10 season to Penticton, to become the Penticton Lakers.

2009–2013: Penticton Lakers
The newly relocated Lakers finished 6th in the Okanagan Division (2009-10 season) and lost 0-3, to the Sicamous Eagles, in the Division Semifinals. The Lakers failed to advance to the Division Finals (second round) in their three-year existence and were eventually relocated to 100 Mile House, to become the Wranglers, because of poor results and attendance.

2013–present: 100 Mile House Wranglers2013-14The Wranglers finished third in the Doug Birks Division as a new relocated team, consequently making the playoffs in their first year in the KIJHL, facing the second seeded-team in their division, the Chase Heat; whom they defeated 4-1 in the opening round. The Wranglers would go on to be swept in the second round by the Kamloops Storm.2014-15In the 2014-2015 season, the Wranglers second, they finished third in their division again and also faced the Heat for the second consecutive time in the Division Semifinals. 100 Mile House would defeat the Heat in six games before losing in the second round to the Kamloops Storm, this time in five games.2015-16In the 2015-16 season, the Wranglers third, they finished atop the Doug Birks Division and would go on to the KIJHL final by way of defeating the Revelstoke Grizzlies, the Chase Heat and the Summerland Steam. Representing the Okanagan/Shuswap Conference, the Wranglers would take down the defending KI champion Kimberley Dynamiters in just five games.CYCLONE TAYLOR CUP100 Mile House then went on to compete in the 2016 Cyclone Taylor Cup in Victoria, BC against the host Victoria Cougars, the Campbell River Storm (VIJHL) and the Mission City Outlaws (PJHL). The Wranglers defeated the Cougars in the gold medal game by a final score of 5-4 on April 10.KEYSTONE CUPThe following week, the Wranglers travelled to Regina, Saskatchewan to compete in the 2016 Keystone Cup against the host Extreme Hockey Regina Capitals, AGI Insurance Quakers (PJHL), the North Peace Navigators (NWJHL), the Peguis Juniors (KJHL) and the Thunder Bay Northern Hawks (TBJHL). On April 17, 100 Mile House defeated the Quakers by a final score of 3-2 to claim their first ever Keystone Cup. Both teams met the night before in the tournament's final round robin game where the Quakers won 6-4. In the final, the Wranglers tying goal and winning goal (2:35 into overtime) were scored by Cole Zimmerman of 100 Mile House, BC. The winning goalie was Zane Steeves of Red Deer, Alberta, who stopped 38 of 40 shots.

Season-by-season recordNote: GP = Games played, W = Wins, L = Losses, T = Ties, D = Defaults, OTL = Overtime Losses, Pts = Points, GF = Goals for, GA = Goals against

Final records as of February 27, 2023.

Playoffs

Cyclone Taylor CupBritish Columbia Jr B Provincial ChampionshipsKeystone CupWestern Canadian Jr. B Championships (Northern Ontario to British Columbia)
Six teams in round robin play. 1st vs 2nd for gold/silver & 3rd vs. 4th for bronze.

Captains

Jaidan Ward: 2013-14
Devan Suidy: 2014-15
Stephen Egan: 2015-16
Ethan Sanders: 2022-Present

Awards and trophiesKeystone Cup2016Cyclone Taylor Cup2016KIJHL Championship2016Conference Champions2015-16Division Champions2015-16Coach of the YearDoug Rogers: 2013-14 (Divisional)Defenceman of the YearJayden Syrota: 2014-15 (Divisional)Most SportsmanlikeLane Van De Wetering: 2013-14 (Divisional)Rookie of the Year'''
Luke Santerno: 2013-14 (Divisional)Rob Raju: 2016-17 (Divisional)''

References

External links
Official website of the 100 Mile House Wranglers 
Information  on the official website of the Kootenay International Junior Hockey League

Ice hockey teams in British Columbia
2013 establishments in British Columbia
Ice hockey clubs established in 2013